On March 21–22, 1952, a severe tornado outbreak generated eleven violent tornadoes across the Southern United States, which is the fourth-largest number of F4–F5 events produced by a single outbreak. Only the 1965 Palm Sunday tornado outbreak, the 1974 Super Outbreak, and the 2011 Super Outbreak surpassed this number. The outbreak caused 209 fatalities–50 of which occurred in a single tornado in Arkansas. The severe weather event also resulted in the fourth-largest number of tornado fatalities within a 24-hour period since 1950.

Background
A large low pressure system raced across the Northern Pacific before reaching the coast of the Southern Alaska panhandle on March 17. A new low formed from the original one and moved quickly southeastward through Canada and the Great Plains before turning eastward over Northern Oklahoma during the afternoon of March 19. It subsequently moved into Southwestern Missouri near Joplin and shot northeastward as another low that had formed in Nevada on March 19 surged into the region on March 21 and made a gradual northeastward turn through North Texas, Southeastern Oklahoma, and Northwestern Arkansas before turning northward on March 22 after it entered Illinois. Favorable conditions in the atmosphere led to a massive area of strong and severe thunderstorms that produced damaging winds, large hail, heavy rain, flooding, lightning, and tornadoes.

Outbreak statistics

Confirmed tornadoes

March 21 event

March 22 event

Non-tornadic effects
The weather system associated with the outbreak also produced several inches of snow across the central and northern Great Plains and the upper Midwest. Blizzard conditions affected Kansas, Nebraska, and South Dakota. A significant blizzard affected the Great Plains. In Kansas,  of snow were recorded. On March 22, Charles City, Iowa, documented , which was the town's greatest 24-hour snowfall record at the time. Minnesota reported , while Bergland, Michigan, reported  of snowfall. Heavy snow and strong winds disrupted highways and road traffic. Flash floods also affected Sumner and Clay counties, Tennessee.

See also
List of tornadoes and tornado outbreaks
List of North American tornadoes and tornado outbreaks
List of F4 and EF4 tornadoes
Tornado records
1932 Deep South tornado outbreak – Produced ten violent tornadoes exactly twenty years earlier
March 1997 tornado outbreak – Deadliest tornado outbreak in Arkansas since May 15, 1968
2008 Super Tuesday tornado outbreak – Affected some of the same regions as the 1952 outbreak

Notes

References

External links
 Judsonia tornado damage photographs

F4 tornadoes by date
 ,1952-03-21
Tornadoes of 1952
Tornadoes in Alabama
Tornadoes in Arkansas
Tornadoes in Mississippi
Tornadoes in Missouri
Tornadoes in Tennessee
Tornado outbreaks
1952 natural disasters in the United States
March 1952 events in the United States